Gazoryctra fuscoargenteus is a moth of the family Hepialidae. It is found from northern Scandinavia to Siberia and the Kamchatka Peninsula.

The wingspan is 37–42 mm for males and 39–50 mm for females. Adults are on wing from the end of July to the beginning of August.

The larvae feed on Betula nana.

References

External links
Lepidoptera of Sweden
Lepidoptera of Norway

Moths described in 1927
Hepialidae
Moths of Europe
Moths of Asia